Vice-Admiral Bernard William Murray Fairbairn, CBE (18 April 1880 – 5 April 1960) was a Royal Navy officer.

During the Second World War, he returned to service first as a convoy commodore from 1939 to 1942, then as Flag Officer in Charge, Milford Haven, from 1942 to 1945.

References

1880 births
1960 deaths
Royal Navy vice admirals
Commanders of the Order of the British Empire
Place of birth missing
Place of death missing
Royal Navy officers of World War I
Royal Navy admirals of World War II